Vedran Purić (born 16 March 1986 in Koprivnica) is a Croatian football manager and retired footballer who last played as a right back. He spent almost his entire career at hometown club Slaven Belupo.

He last served as a caretaker manager for Slaven Belupo in 2018.

Career statistics

References

External links
 

1986 births
Living people
Sportspeople from Koprivnica
Association football fullbacks
Croatian footballers
NK Slaven Belupo players
NK Koprivnica players
Croatian Football League players